Colmenero is a Spanish surname. Notable people with the surname include:

 Francisco Colmenero (born 1932), Mexican voice actor and director
 Francisco Ferreira Colmenero (born 1967), Spanish footballer known as Patxi Ferreira
 José Manuel Colmenero Crespo (born 1973), Spanish footballer
 Juan Ruiz de Colmenero (1596–1663), Spanish bishop
 Alicia Diana Santos Colmenero (born 1950), Mexican voice actress

Spanish-language surnames